This is a list of episodes for the American private detective crime drama television series Vegas, which aired on ABC from April 25, 1978, to June 3, 1981.

Series overview
{| class="wikitable" style="text-align:center"
|-
! style="padding: 0 8px;" colspan="2" rowspan="2"| Season
! style="padding: 0 8px;" rowspan="2"| Episodes
! colspan="2"| Originally aired
|-
! style="padding: 0 8px;"| First aired
! Last aired
|-
| style="background:#CDAD00; color:#100; text-align:center;"|
| [[List of Vegas (1978 TV series) episodes#Season 1 (1978–79)|1]]
| 22
| 
| 
|-
| style="background:#B0171F; color:#100; text-align:center;"|
| [[List of Vegas (1978 TV series) episodes#Season 2 (1979–80)|2]]
| 23
| 
| 
|-
| style="background:#500050; color:#100; text-align:center;"|
| [[List of Vegas (1978 TV series) episodes#Season 3 (1980–81)|3]]
| 23
| 
| 
|}

Episodes

TV Movie

Season 1 (1978–79)

Season 2 (1979–80)

Season 3 (1980–81)

External links
 
 

Vegas